There will be a total of 128 qualifying places available for taekwondo at the 2015 European Games: 64 for men and 64 for women. 16 athletes will compete in each of the 8 events. Each competing nation will be allowed to enter a maximum of 8 competitors in total (4 men and 4 women), and a maximum of 1 athlete in any weight class. Hosts Azerbaijan is also allowed to enter an athlete in each weight class. Quota places will be allocated by reference to the World Taekwondo Federation Olympic Ranking List as it stands on 31 March 2015.

Qualification summary

Men

58 kg

68 kg

80 kg

+80 kg

Women

49 kg

57 kg

67 kg

+67 kg

References

Qualification
Qualification for the 2015 European Games